MWE may refer to:
Manufacturer's Weight Empty 
McDermott Will & Emery, international law firm
Merowe Airport, Sudan - IATA code
Midwest Express, now Midwest Airlines
Minimal working example, in computer science
Multiword expression

MWe may refer to:
Megawatt electrical